Marek Świerczewski (born 2 March 1967) is a Polish former professional footballer who played as a defender. He played for ten teams over the course of a 28-year football career. His younger brother Piotr is also a former footballer and Poland international.

References

Living people
1967 births
Sportspeople from Nowy Sącz
Association football defenders
Polish footballers
Poland international footballers
Wisła Kraków players
GKS Katowice players
SK Sturm Graz players
FK Austria Wien players
Hutnik Nowa Huta players
FC Admira Wacker Mödling players
1. Simmeringer SC players
Favoritner AC players
Polish expatriate footballers
Expatriate footballers in Austria
Polish expatriate sportspeople in Austria